Nine ships and a naval base of the Royal Navy have been named HMS Neptune after the Roman god of the ocean:

  was a 90-gun second rate launched in 1683.  She was rebuilt in 1710 and 1730 before being renamed HMS Torbay in her new incarnation as a third rate in 1750.  She was sold in 1784.
  was a 90-gun second rate launched in 1757.  She was hulked in 1784 and broken up in 1816.
  was a 98-gun second rate launched in 1797.  She fought at the battle of Trafalgar and was broken up in 1818.
 HMS Neptune was to have been a 120-gun first rate.  She was renamed  in 1822, before being launched in 1827. Royal George was sold in 1875.
  was a 120-gun first rate launched in 1832.  She was rebuilt as a 72-gun third rate with screw propulsion in 1859 and was sold in 1875.
  was a coastguard cutter built in 1863 and sold in 1905. 
  was an ironclad warship launched in 1874 as Independência, intended for the Brazilian Navy. Acquired by the Royal Navy in 1878, she was sold in 1903.
  was an early dreadnought launched in 1909 and scrapped in 1922.
  was a  light cruiser launched in 1933 and sunk in a minefield off Tripoli in 1941.
 HMS Neptune was a projected  in the 1945 Naval Estimates, but the plans were cancelled in March 1946 and she was never ordered. 
HMS Neptune (shore establishment) is the name given to the shore establishment at HMNB Clyde.

See also
 , two submarines of the Swedish Navy

Royal Navy ship names